Mario Petri (21 January 1922 – 26 January 1985) was an Italian operatic bass-baritone particularly associated with Mozart and Rossini roles.

Life and career
Petri was born in Perugia and began his career after World War II, making his stage debut in 1947 at the Teatro alla Scala in Milan, where he sang the following year the role of Creonte in the premiere of Stravinsky's Oedipus Rex, he also sang there his first Don Giovanni in 1950, a role he quickly became associated with throughout Italy.

He appeared in Rome, Florence, Venice, Parma, Bergamo, Verona, Naples. He sang opposite Maria Callas in the revival of Cherubini's Medea. In 1951, for the celebration of Verdi's 50th death anniversary, he sang on Italian radio (RAI) in I Lombardi, I masnadieri, and Simon Boccanegra.

Soon his reputation as Don Giovanni led to invitation to appear at the festivals of Glyndebourne, Salzburg, and Edinburgh. He sang relatively little outside Europe, though he made a few guest appearances in Dallas, in 1965.

His repertory included both Paisiello's and Rossini's  Il barbiere di Siviglia, Le nozze di Figaro, L'italiana in Algeri, La cenerentola, Mosè in Egitto, Semiramide, opposite Joan Sutherland, etc.

On records, Petri can be heard in L'italiana in Algeri, opposite Giulietta Simionato as Isabella and Cesare Valletti as Lindoro, under Carlo Maria Giulini, as well as the aforementioned I Lombardi and Simon Boccanegra.

A 1960 Italian television production of Don Giovanni has been released on DVD, with a cast including Teresa Stich-Randall as Anna, Leyla Gencer as Elvira, Graziella Sciutti as Zerlina, Luigi Alva as Ottavio, and Sesto Bruscantini as Leporello.

From 1960 to 1965 he appeared in 18 motion pictures, mostly in the "Sword and Sandal" genre. He died at Città della Pieve, aged 63.

Repertoire
Mozart
Figaro/Le Nozze di Figaro
Don Giovanni/Don Giovanni
Sarastro/Die Zauberflöte
Monteverdi
Seneca/L'incoronazione di Poppea
Paisiello
Don Basilio/Il barbiere di Siviglia
Pergolesi
Count Robinson/La cambiale di matrimonio
Cherubini
King Creon/Medea
Galuppi
Don Tritemio/Il filosofo di campagna
Rossini
Mustafa/L'italiana in Algeri
Don Basilio/Il barbiere di Siviglia
Don Magnifico/La cenerentola
Mose/Mosè in Egitto
Assur/Semiramide
Donizetti
Duke Don Alfonso/Lucrezia Borgia
Verdi
Pagano/I Lombardi alla prima crociata
Macbeth/Macbeth
Massimiliano/I masnadieri
Jacopo Fiesco/Simon Boccanegra
Renato/Un ballo in maschera
Rodrigo, Marchese di Posa/Don Carlos
Ramfis/Aida
Puccini
Jack Rance/La fanciulla del west
Ponchielli
Alvise/La Gioconda
Boito
Simon Mago/Nerone
Debussy
Arkel/Pelléas et Mélisande
Pizzetti
Agamennone/Clitennestra

Sources
 Operissimo.com

1922 births
1985 deaths
Operatic basses
20th-century Italian male opera singers